St. Mark's Episcopal Church is a parish of the Episcopal Church in Palatka, Florida in the United States, in the Episcopal Diocese of Florida. The current rector is the Reverend Robert F Marsh Jr., D. Min.

It is noted for its historic Carpenter Gothic church located at 200 Main Street. On May 9, 1973, it was added to the National Register of Historic Places.

History
The oldest church in Palatka, St. Mark's was established in 1853. The Carpenter Gothic church building was erected in 1854 using board and batten siding with corner buttresses on the base of the bell tower. One of the founding members of St. Mark's was William D. Moseley, first governor of the state of Florida. During the early years, services were held only in the winter months and were conducted by visiting vicars from the Northern States. During the Civil War, the church was occupied by Union soldiers, who caused much damage to the structure. The church reopened after the war and achieved full parish status by 1873.

National Register listing
St. Marks Episcopal Church
(added 1973 - Building - #73000602)
2nd and Main Sts., Palatka
Historic Significance: Event
Area of Significance: 	Religion
Period of Significance: 	1850–1874, 1875–1899
Owner: 	Private
Historic Function: 	Religion
Historic Sub-function: 	Religious Structure
Current Function: 	Religion
Current Sub-function: 	Religious Structure

Gallery

See also

 National Register of Historic Places listings in Florida
 St. Mark's Episcopal Church

References

External links
 Putnam County listings at National Register of Historic Places
 Florida's Office of Cultural and Historical Programs
 Putnam County listings
 Putnam County markers
 Palatka Historical Trail at Historic Hiking Trails
St. Mark's website

Palatka, Florida
Tourist attractions in Palatka, Florida
National Register of Historic Places in Putnam County, Florida
Churches on the National Register of Historic Places in Florida
Episcopal church buildings in Florida
Carpenter Gothic church buildings in Florida
Churches in Putnam County, Florida
1853 establishments in Florida
Religious organizations established in 1853
Churches completed in 1854